Həkəri is a village in the Zangilan District of Azerbaijan. On 20 October 2020 President of Azerbaijan Ilham Aliyev announced that the village had been recaptured by the Azerbaijani forces.

References

Populated places in Zangilan District